Carolina Bank Field is a baseball stadium in Florence, South Carolina. The ballpark is home field for the Florence Flamingos, a collegiate summer baseball team in the Coastal Plain League. It is part of the Florence Sports Complex. The ballpark opened on Saturday, May 28, 2022.

In September 2020, the then-named Florence RedWolves signed a ten-year stadium lease with two five-year lease options. In April 2021, the RedWolves and Carolina Bank jointly announced a 10-year naming rights agreement. In July 2021, the RedWolves changed their name to the Flamingos.

References

External links
 Florence Flamingos - official site
 Coastal Plain League - official site

Baseball venues in South Carolina
Buildings and structures in Florence, South Carolina
Sports venues in Florence County, South Carolina
Sports venues completed in 2022
2022 establishments in South Carolina